Eric Glen Blackman (born September 21, 1968 in Rochester, New York) is an American astrophysicist and professor.

Education and career 
Blackman graduated from the Harley School, and then 
obtained undergraduate degrees in  physics and mathematics from the Massachusetts Institute of Technology. He worked at the General Electric Research Laboratory  during undergraduate summers. He subsequently completed a Master of Advanced Study  in mathematics (applied math/theoretical physics, Part III of the Mathematical Tripos) at  Cambridge University, residing at Trinity College, Cambridge, followed by a Phd at  Harvard University working in theoretical astrophysics with George B. Field.   He was a postdoctoral fellow at the 
Institute of Astronomy, Cambridge of Cambridge University and in physics at Caltech
before joining the Department of Physics and Astronomy faculty at the University of Rochester.

Blackman has made diverse contributions to theoretical astrophysics through 250+ research publications  on topics that include stellar and planetary astrophysics, molecular clouds, planetary nebulae, accretion, jets, particle acceleration, turbulence, laboratory astrophysics, and relativistic astrophysics—including gamma-ray bursts and active galactic nuclei. He is particularly known for work in  plasma astrophysics involving magnetic fields, and principles of astrophysical dynamo theory—the latter being a theory of magnetic field origin in astrophysical objects such as galaxies, stars, accretion disks and planets.    Blackman has also worked on the mechanics and biomechanics of helmet protection against closed traumatic brain injury, identifying protection deficiencies in standard helmets for both head impacts and blast exposure.

Appointments and Awards
1994 Jewett Fund Prize, Harvard University (Cambridge MA)
2000-2003 Assistant & Associate Professor of Physics and Astronomy, University of Rochester (Rochester NY)
2000-2004 Faculty Development Grant Award in Plasma Physics, US Department of Energy
2004–present Professor of Physics and Astronomy, University of Rochester (Rochester NY)
2005–present Fellow of the American Physical Society
2006-2007 Defense Science Study Group, Institute for Defense Analyses (Alexandria VA)
2014-2015 Simons Fellow in Theoretical Physics
2014-2015 IBM-Einstein Fellow  Institute for Advanced Study (Princeton NJ)

References

External links 
Eric G. Blackman University of Rochester
Eric G. Blackman, Google Scholar

Massachusetts Institute of Technology School of Science alumni
Alumni of the University of Cambridge
Alumni of Trinity College, Cambridge
Harvard University alumni
People from Rochester, New York
University of Rochester faculty
Institute for Advanced Study visiting scholars
1968 births
Living people
21st-century American scientists
21st-century American physicists
American astrophysicists
Fellows of the American Physical Society
MIT Department of Physics alumni